Uroš Damnjanović (born 8 February 1995) is a Serbian football midfielder who plays for Greek club Irodotos.

Club career
On 31 August 2021, he signed with Irodotos in Greece.

References

External links
 Profile on Official website
 
 
 Stats at Utakmica.rs

1995 births
Footballers from Belgrade
Living people
Serbian footballers
Association football midfielders
Serbia youth international footballers
Serbia under-21 international footballers
FK Rad players
FK Teleoptik players
FK Partizan players
FK Sinđelić Beograd players
ŠK Slovan Bratislava players
FK Radnički Niš players
FK Radnik Surdulica players
Irodotos FC players
Serbian SuperLiga players
Serbian First League players
2. Liga (Slovakia) players
Slovak Super Liga players
Serbian expatriate footballers
Expatriate footballers in Slovakia
Serbian expatriate sportspeople in Slovakia
Expatriate footballers in Greece
Serbian expatriate sportspeople in Greece